Casas Bajas is a municipality in the comarca of Rincón de Ademuz in the Valencian Community, Spain.

References

Municipalities in the Province of Valencia
Rincón de Ademuz